Zayn-al-Dīn Qarāja Beg (11 December 1353) was a Turkoman chieftain, who founded the Dulkadirid principality ruling from 1337 to 1353. After gaining recognition from the Mamluks, he became the head of a client state on their Anatolian frontier. Through his rule, Qarāja grew more ambitious and declared independence in 1348, which led to his imprisonment by the Mamluks and consequent execution.

Early life and background
In 1298, the Armenian regions around Marash came under the dominion of the Mamluk Sultans, who granted these lands to the walis of Aleppo and Turkoman lords through iqta'. Dulkadir, the father of Qarāja and the leader of the Turkoman tribes in the region, is mentioned in Qaramannameh written by the Karamanid historian Shikari, where Dulkadir is reported to have sent his son with 40 thousand men to support the Anatolian Seljuks against the Karamanids, which resulted in his imprisonment by Mehmet I of Karaman. Though, it is believed that this was Dulkadir himself instead and not his son.

Qarāja likely belonged to the Bayat tribe. He became the leader of the Bozok tribal confederation in northern Syria after his father died in 1310 or 1311. Though, the first mention of him in sources is thought to be from 1317, when the  Mamluk Sultan Al-Nasir Muhammad granted a Turkoman lord residing in Birecik the title emir.

Rise to power
The Dulkadirids rose to prominence within the Mamluk dominion by organizing raids and capturing frontier towns of the Eretnids, when the ruler Eretna started showing signs of disloyalty towards the Mamluks. Qarāja took Elbistan from another Turkoman lord, called Taraqlu Halil, in 1335. In 1337, he was recognized by Al-Nasir Muhammad as the na'ib of the lands stretching from Marash to Elbistan. The next year, he also captured Harpoot, Darende, Gemerek, and Gürün from the Eretnids.

Downfall and execution
Qarāja's relationship with the Mamluks started deteriorating when in 1343, the Dulkadir Turkomans robbed the caravan containing Eretna's gifts to the Mamluk emir Yalbugha. Though, Qarāja was able to get a pardon from the sultan. Meanwhile, he led several incursions into the Armenian Kingdom of Cilicia, looting the region and occupying Androun and Gabon in 1345. In 1348, gaining confidence from his victories, he declared independence as Malik al-Qāhir. Qarāja further joined emir Baybugha's revolt against the state and defeated Yalbugha. In response, Mamluk governors of Syria and rival Turkoman tribal leaders joined forces, reportedly reaching 10 to 25 thousand troops. Two of his sons, including his successor Halil Beg, tried fend off the Mamluk forces but were defeated and captured. 

In 1353, Qarāja took refuge in the court of the Eretnid ruler Giyath al-Din Muhammad. Though, upon the demand of the Mamluks, he was sent to Aleppo on 22 September 1353, for which Muhammad was paid 500 thousand dinars. One of Qarāja's sons agreed with the Bedouin leader Jabbar bin Muhanna to attack Aleppo in order to save his father. This was to no success and further angered Sultan Salih, who demanded Qarāja's transfer to Cairo. Sultan Salih scolded him in person and kept him in the Citadel of Cairo. After being imprisoned for 48 days, he was tortured to death on 11 December 1353. His corpse was left hanging on Bab Zuweila for 3 days.

References

Bibliography
 
 
 
 
 
 
 
 

1353 deaths
13th-century Turkic people
14th-century Turkic people
14th-century executions
Dulkadirids